Immanuel Chung-Yueh Hsü (1923 – October 24, 2005) was a sinologist, a scholar of modern Chinese intellectual and diplomatic history, and a professor of history at the University of California at Santa Barbara.

Biography 
Born in Shanghai in 1923, he studied at Yenching University in Beijing, and the University of Minnesota. He held a Harvard-Yenching Fellowship at Harvard University from 1950 to 1954. After receiving his doctorate from Harvard, he spent the years 1955–1958 as a Research Fellow at Harvard's East Asian Research Center. He taught modern Chinese history at the University of California at Santa Barbara from 1959 until his retirement in 1991, serving as Chair of the History department from 1970 to 1972. He was a Guggenheim Fellow in 1962–1963, as well as a Fulbright Fellow. His most widely read book is The Rise of Modern China, a survey of Chinese history from 1600 to the present, and a standard textbook.

He died of complications from pneumonia on October 24, 2005.

Tribute

According to Jonathan Spence in the Preface to the Chinese translation of his book The Search for Modern China, the "two most prominent previous (to The Search for Modern China) English-language surveys" (of modern Chinese history) were the one "by John King Fairbank in the 1960s and the one by Immanuel Hsu in the 1970s." Spence acknowledged that he had learned much from these two scholars.

Notes

Publications

The Rise of Modern China, Oxford University Press (First edition, 1970; sixth edition, 2000).
Intellectual Trends in the Ch'ing Period
China's entry into the Family of Nations: The Diplomatic Phase, 1858–1880
The Ili Crisis: A Study of Sino-Russian Diplomacy, 1871–1881
China Without Mao: The Search for a New Order, Oxford University Press, 1983.
Chapter on Late Ch’ing foreign relations, 1866–1905 in The Cambridge History of China, Volume 11: Late Ch'ing, 1800–1911, edited by John K. Fairbank and Kwang-Ching Liu, Cambridge University Press. (Publisher's Catalogue)

Chinese sinologists
Harvard University alumni
University of Minnesota alumni
University of California, Santa Barbara faculty
Chinese emigrants to the United States
1923 births
2005 deaths
Fulbright alumni